The following is an alphabetical list of members of the United States House of Representatives from the commonwealth of Massachusetts.  For chronological tables of members of both houses of the United States Congress from the state (through the present day), see United States congressional delegations from Massachusetts.  The list of names should be complete, but other data may be incomplete.

Current representatives 

 : Richard Neal (D) (since 1989)
 : Jim McGovern (D) (since 1997)
 : Lori Trahan (D) (since 2019)
 : Jake Auchincloss (D) (since 2021)
 : Katherine Clark (D) (since 2013)
 : Seth Moulton (D) (since 2015)
 : Ayanna Pressley (D) (since 2019)
 : Stephen F. Lynch (D) (since 2001)
 : Bill Keating (D) (since 2011)

List of members

See also

List of United States senators from Massachusetts
United States congressional delegations from Massachusetts
Massachusetts's congressional districts

Notes

References

 Congressional Biographical Directory of the United States 1774–present

 
Massachusetts
United States representatives